He Hongmei is a Chinese judoka who competes in the women's 52 kg category. She was defeated in the first round of the 2012 Summer Olympics.

References

External links
 
 

Living people
Olympic judoka of China
Judoka at the 2012 Summer Olympics
Sportspeople from Hunan
Judoka at the 2010 Asian Games
Asian Games medalists in judo
Chinese female judoka
Medalists at the 2010 Asian Games
Asian Games bronze medalists for China
1983 births
21st-century Chinese women